Dan Nielson may refer to:

Daniel Nielson (born 1996), Australian rules footballer
Dan Nielson (basketball) (born 1983), American basketball coach